The Wrath is the name of two fictional supervillains published by DC Comics. The original Wrath debuted in Batman Special #1 (1984), and was created by Mike W. Barr and Michael Golden, who served as a criminal foil personality to the superhero Batman, after the creation of Killer Moth (in 1951) and prior to the creations of the villains Prometheus (in 1998) and Hush (in 2003), all serving the same purpose. The second Wrath debuted in Batman Confidential #13 (March 2008), and was created by Tony Bedard and Rags Morales.

Publication history
The Wrath's debut story was titled "The Player on the Other Side", published in Batman Special #1 (1984). The title was based on the essay "A Liberal Education and Where to Find It" by Thomas Henry Huxley (although mistakenly attributed to Aldous Huxley by Bruce Wayne). It is also a reference to the Ellery Queen novel of the same name, as the story's author, Mike W. Barr, is a renowned Queen enthusiast.

A Post-Infinite Crisis legacy version of the Wrath debuted in the pages of Batman Confidential #13 in a story arc written by Tony Bedard, with Elliott Caldwell, the 'student' of the original Wrath, taking on his mentor's mantle.

Fictional character biography

The original Wrath

The first Wrath was an enemy of Batman, described by him as his "opposite number". The Wrath's appearance and motivation are reminiscent of Batman's, but with notable differences. The Wrath (like Batman) is distinguished by perfectionism and obsession with what he does. His costume is also very similar to Batman's (though colored in crimson and purple with a W-insignia on the chest and cowl; the W on his cowl, when seen in the right light and at the right angle, looks like the ears of the Batman's cowl).

Wrath's parents were a couple of burglars like Joe Chill, the man who shot and killed Batman's parents. They were killed in a shootout with a police officer coincidentally the same day that Batman's parents were gunned down in Crime Alley. Due to this, the Wrath dedicated his life to a campaign of revenge against law and law-enforcers. Independently of one another, Batman and the Wrath adopted strikingly similar costumes and skill-sets, although they used them for opposite purposes.

When the Wrath finally returns to Gotham City, he comes to kill the man who had shot his parents. The Wrath's target turns out to be Commissioner Gordon of the Gotham City Police which leads to the Wrath coming into conflict with Batman. In the course of their impersonal battle of wits, the Wrath learns Batman's secret identity as Bruce Wayne and proceeds to attack several of his friends; Alfred Pennyworth is hospitalized, and Leslie Thompkins is taken hostage by the Wrath.

During his rooftop showdown with Batman, one of the Wrath's explosive capsules detonates during the fight; Batman's attempt to throw the Wrath off of him leads to the villain accidentally landing in his fire and falling over the edge to his death. Looking down from the rooftop, Batman remarks that watching Wrath's death felt like watching his own.

In "Wrath Child" (Batman Confidential #13-16), several details of the Wrath's origin underwent a retcon, including the original story taking place shortly after Dick Grayson became Robin (the original story was published the same year that Grayson became Nightwing), with Grayson missing the events because he was away at the time on an "educational holiday" (one of the various training missions Batman sent him on). The Wrath's father is now depicted as a corrupt cop who was robbing a warehouse with his wife and so acting as a lookout. Gordon confronted them and, in a gunfight, killed the parents in self-defense. Additionally, the Wrath is now depicted as having copied Batman, whereas in his original appearance, this is never suggested and it is implied that they both developed nearly identical personas independently. When Batman hears the story of the Wrath's origins from the original's successor, the young Wrath II claims that only his predecessor's father was armed and Gordon shot to kill first but, in reality, his father fired first, and then his mother took up his father's gun, with Gordon's shots only being fatal because his aim was off due to his injuries (it is unclear if the young Wrath II believed this story because he heard it from his mentor, or if his mentor told him the truth and then twisted it to make the Wrath seem like a victim). Abandoned by the cops to conceal the corruption - Gordon going along with the plan because then-Captain Gillian B. Loeb threatened to kill the boy (as he was the only witness) if he talked - the Wrath became a contract killer in the hopes of "avenging his parents again and again". While preparing to assassinate Gordon, the Wrath studied Batman and initially planned to dress just like him to needle Gordon. However, he concluded that they were kindred spirits inspired by a similar disaster in their lives and duplicated Batman's costume and equipment as an homage - to the extent that he began training his own "Robin", who went on to become the Wrath II.

Elliot Caldwell

Sporting an all-purple costume, this Wrath, who Batman deduces is a copycat from his first appearance owing to the differences in age, physical build, and training, begins murdering police officers visiting Gotham for a convention and breaks into Gayle Hudson's apartment. After a fight with Batman - during which he confirms that he is not the original Wrath and is unaware of Batman's true identity - he tells the Dark Knight to investigate Commissioner Gordon's actions on June 26, 25 years ago, the same night that Bruce Wayne's parents died. Upon another meeting with Batman, the Wrath II tells a distorted version of the events that happened (although it is unclear if he is reciting the version he learned from the Wrath or if he has twisted it in his mind), saying Gordon killed the Wrath's parents in cold blood, though Batman saw through this and realized that Gordon shot them in self-defense. His subsequent assessment of the original Wrath helps Batman determine the identity of the second one; as the Wrath sought to duplicate all of Batman's methods, Batman concludes that the Wrath II must be the Wrath's equivalent of Robin.

Batman and Nightwing, upon confronting the Wrath II for a final time, reveal that they have learned that the Wrath II's real name was Elliot Caldwell, an orphaned boy whom the Wrath trained to be his answer to Robin, based on a psychological profile run by Alfred looking for children in Dick's age range who disappeared around the time that the Wrath was active. Elliot was one of five orphans who the original Wrath kidnapped and trained, but he was the only one who survived the training. Despite Caldwell's refusal to believe their claims and his subsequent efforts to continue fighting, he was stopped by Batman and Nightwing, whose teamwork and care for each other forced Caldwell to recognize that he had never had the same relationship with his mentor. He was subsequently sent to Blackgate Penitentiary, although he reflected that he would be ready to face them again in the future, now that his 'emotional weakness' had been purged.

The New 52
In September 2011, another version of the Wrath appeared during The New 52 rebooted DC's continuity. In the new timeline, E. D. Caldwell is the CEO of Caldwell Tech, who appears as a legitimate magnate trying to buy Wayne Enterprises. When a series of policeman murders strikes Gotham, Batman deduces that Caldwell is a sociopath killer using the company to create an army of soldiers called Scorn (namely a thug named Clyde Anderson) and adopting the codename of the "Wrath". Caldwell manages to capture Alfred Pennyworth and plans to murder him.Detective Comics (vol. 2) #23 (October 2013) After failing to kill Batman, the Wrath kills Anderson while preparing his suit to face Batman in combat. 

The Wrath then went after Batman as he chased him in his plane through the streets of Gotham, forcing Batman to abandon his Batplane to gain more time and cause it to self destruct and him to escape on his Bat-Glider. Alfred, after having hacked Caldwell's files, revealed to Bruce that Elliot's father had been killed by corrupt Gotham police officers. Elliot later used his tank to bomb Gotham City Station; he then got out of his tank, expecting to find a mass of dead police officers. Instead, he found only Batman, as Bruce had convinced James Gordon to evacuate the building where Batman, in a modified suit similar in style to the Wrath's, proceeded to beat down Elliot; however, he did not deliver the finishing blow. He instead allowed the Gotham Police Department to open fire on him and revealed to him that it was James Gordon who brought down the police officers who killed his father and proceeded to knock him out. Helped by the Gotham City Police Department, the Batman finally defeats the Wrath. While in Blackgate Penitentiary, the Wrath is greeted by Gordon, after which the Wrath meets with Emperor Blackgate, where they both begin a partnership.

In other media
Wrath and Scorn appear in The Batman'' episode "The End of the Batman", voiced by Christopher Gorham and Daryl Sabara respectively. William Mallory and his younger brother Andrew "Andy" Mallory''' were the children of jewel thieves who were caught and convicted on the same night that Thomas and Martha Wayne were shot. Being young children at the time, the event motivated the young Mallories to become the Wrath and Scorn to help criminals in their crimes and defend them from Batman under the belief that criminals have a right to make a living as much as innocents do. While helping Gotham's criminals, the Mallories come into conflict with Batman and Robin, though, in their civilian identities, they befriend those of the Dynamic Duo: Bruce Wayne and Dick Grayson. Ultimately, this "friendship" leads to the four deducing each other's identities. While the Mallories are eventually captured, they plan to reveal the duo's secret identities. Batman is willing to accept the outcome, but the Joker, not wanting to lose his greatest source of fun, poses as a police officer to infect the Mallories with his Joker venom, leaving them laughing uncontrollably.

See also
 List of Batman family enemies

References

External links
 DCU Guide: Wrath

Characters created by Michael Golden
Characters created by Mike W. Barr
Characters created by Rags Morales
Comics characters introduced in 1984
Comics characters introduced in 2008
DC Comics male supervillains
DC Comics martial artists
DC Comics orphans
Fictional assassins in comics
Fictional business executives
Fictional professional thieves
Identity theft in popular culture
Batman characters